OEI or Oei can refer to:

OEI
Organization of Ibero-American States, known by the Spanish and Portuguese-derived acronym, OEI
Ozarks Entertainment, Inc., a former owner of the Dogpatch USA amusement park in the United States

Oei
Ōei, a Japanese era name spanning from 1394 to 1428

Surname
David Oei, Hong Kong-born American classical pianist 
Madame Wellington Koo (born Oei Hui-lan), Chinese-Indonesian international socialite and style icon, briefly First Lady of the Republic of China
Oei Tiong Ham, Majoor-titulair der Chinezen, colonial Chinese-Indonesian tycoon in Southeast Asia
Oei Wie Gwan, Chinese-Indonesian businessman and founder of Djarum

See also
Oey, a surname